In type theory, a type system has the property of subject reduction (also subject evaluation, type preservation or simply preservation) if evaluation of expressions does not cause their type to change. Formally, if Γ ⊢ e1 : τ and e1 → e2  then Γ ⊢ e2 : τ. Intuitively, this means one would not like to write a expression, in say Haskell, of type Int, and have it evaluate to a value v, only to find out that v is a string.

Together with progress, it is an important meta-theoretical property for establishing type soundness of a type system.

The opposite property, if Γ ⊢ e2 : τ and e1 → e2  then Γ ⊢ e1 : τ, is called subject expansion. It often does not hold as evaluation can erase ill-typed sub-terms of an expression, resulting in a well-typed one.

References 
  
 

Type theory
Management cybernetics